Mario Roccuzzo (November 9, 1940 – October 9, 2021) was an American actor, most commonly known for his episodic roles on television police dramas, although he played various parts on significant sitcoms and in films. His appearances include Hill Street Blues, Barney Miller, and NYPD Blue, as well as Star Trek: The Next Generation and The Untouchables. He had over 250 television roles, and a dozen in feature films. In addition, in 1958, Roccuzzo wrote the famous Eddie Cochran rock song, "Nervous Breakdown".

Biography 
Roccuzzo's parents were both actors working in an East Coast Italian repertory, inspiring him to take the acting career path at an early age. When Mario was 10, his father died and his mother relocated the family to California, where he began taking night classes for acting, first with Jeff Corey, then Corey Allen. In 1960, at the age of 20, he appeared, uninvited, in the office of director John Frankenheimer of Columbia Studios, asking for a chance to audition for whatever film he was making next. This led to his first big break, playing Diavolo in the film The Young Savages.

Next, he played Nicky on the top television show, The Untouchables. He initially became typecast in "bad guy" roles, but this gradually expanded to general roles in police/crime shows, both drama and comedy.

Filmography 
This filmography is very incomplete. For the complete list, check here.

References

External links 
 
 Mario Roccuzzo on NowCasting.com
 Mario Roccuzzo on filmreference.com

1940 births
2021 deaths
20th-century American male actors
21st-century American male actors
American male film actors
American male television actors
Male actors from Boston
American people of Italian descent